The following are the association football events of the year 1892 throughout the world.

Events

Clubs founded in 1892

Chile
Club de Deportes Santiago Wanderers

Czech Republic
Slavia Prague

England
Bromley F.C.
Droylsden F.C.
Liverpool F.C.
Newcastle United F.C.
Old Castle Swifts F.C.

Netherlands
Vitesse Arnhem

Germany
Hertha BSC

National champions
England: Sunderland
Ireland: Linfield
Scotland:
Football League – Dumbarton
Scottish Cup – Celtic

International tournaments
1892 British Home Championship (February 27 – April 7, 1892)

Births
April 29: Henri Bard, French footballer (d. 1951)

References 

 
Association football by year